Deep Water Acres is a US-based independent webzine and record label dedicated to experimental music. Originally a physical magazine called Deep Water, the Internet publication features musical commentaries, reviews, artist profiles and interviews as well as Australian campfire recipes. Since 2005, Deep Water also operates as an independent record label under the name Deep Water Sonic Productions. The label has so far released over 40 full length CDs of experimental music, covering acts such as Ashtray Navigations, Agitated Radio Pilot, United Bible Studies, Niagara Falls, The Goner, Evening Fires, Heavy Winged, Brother Ong, Dead Sea Apes and Alligator Crystal Moth.

Releases

References

External links
Deep Water Acres

American independent record labels
Online music magazines published in the United States
Magazines with year of establishment missing
Experimental music